Adrian Ion (born 9 August 1986) is a Romanian rugby union footballer. He plays the position of flanker.

His father Gheorghe nicknamed Tarzan was also a professional rugby player.

Club career
He currently plays for and captains CSM București, in the Romanian SuperLiga, transferring in 2013 from Farul Constanța. Before playing for Farul, Ion played for Bucharest side, Dinamo.

International career
Ion also plays for The Oaks making his international debut in a 2012 test match against Los Leones.

In 2018 he was recalled for the national team for the game against Portugal and November Tests.

In 2019 Ion also was selected for The Oaks and played in Europe Rugby Championship.

Ion captained The Oaks in the wins against Russia and Belgium. Both games count for Europe Rugby Championship 2019 when they finish on 3rd position.

References

External links

1986 births
Living people
Romanian rugby union players
Romania international rugby union players
București Wolves players
CS Dinamo București (rugby union) players
RCJ Farul Constanța players
CSM București (rugby union) players
Rugby union flankers
Rugby union players from Bucharest